Belarusian State University of Physical Culture is a university in Minsk, Belarus. University is an institution in the field of physical education, sports and tourism in the Republic of Belarus offering preparatory, high and post-graduate levels of training. There are 160 World and European champions among the University students and graduates.

Structure

There are 4 faculties, 27 chairs:
Departments:

Faculty of Sport Games and Combative Sport

Faculty of Mass Sports

The Faculty of Health – Oriented Physical Training and Tourism

Institute of Tourism

Specialists Updating and Retraining Institute

Administration
Rector - Ryhor Kasiachenka

Well known graduates
Among those who graduated from the University we can also name the Olympic champions Svetlana Boginskaya, Vitaly Scherbo, Marina Lobach, Alexander Medved, Oleg Karavayev, Vladimir Kaminsky, Oleg Logvin, Alexander Romankov, Romuald Klim, Elena Zvereva, Yanina Korolchik, Vladimir Parfenovich, Yekaterina Karsten and others.

References

External links
 Belarusian State University of Physical Culture

Universities in Minsk